Jobst Nikolaus I, Count of Hohenzollern (also known as Jost Nikolaus I or Jos Nikolaus I; 1433 – 9 February 1488) was a German nobleman from the Swabian branch of the House of Hohenzollern.  He was the ruling Count of Hohenzollern from shortly after his birth until his death.

Life 
Jobst Nikolaus I became the nominal ruler of the County of Hohenzollern shortly after his birth.  Initially, he stood under the regency and guardianship of his father Eitel Friedrich I ( – 1439).  Under a succession treaty of 1429 with the House of Württemberg, the County would fall to the Counts of Württemberg if the Swabian branch of the House of Hohenzollern were to die out in the male line.  With Jobst Nikolaus's birth, this risk was averted.

Emperor Friedrich III granted Jobst Nikolaus I and his heirs in 1471 the right to operate a mine in his county, and the right to mint coins.  In 1488, Jobst Nikolaus acquired the Lordship of Haigerloch.  He rebuilt the ancestral seat, Hohenzollern Castle.  It would serve as the residence of the Counts of Hohenzollern until the late 18th century.

The county had come in a precarious political situation during the reign of the preceding generation.  The county was fragmented when it had been divided between his father and his uncle Friedrich XII.  The financial situation was almost hopeless and there was a risk that the Swabian line of the Hohenzollerns might die out.  Friedrich XII had sold some land to improve the financial situation, however, this meant that the county became politically insignificant.  The situation began to improve during the reign of Jobst Nikolaus's father, Eitel Friedrich I.  Jobst Nikolaus managed to enlarge the territory significantly.  This positive development continued under his son Eitel Friedrich II.

Marriage and issue 
In 1448, Jobst Nikolaus married Countess Agnes of Werdenberg-Heiligenberg (1434–1467), a sister of Bishop Johann II of Augsburg.  Together, they had the following children:

 Friedrich (1451 – 8 March 1505), Bishop of Augsburg
 Eitel Friedrich II (1452–1512), his successor as Count of Hohenzollern
 Eitel Friedrich the Younger (1454 – 27 June 1490), Dutch admiral
 Friedrich Albrecht († 16 July 1483), a colonel in the imperial army, fell before Utrecht
 Friedrich Johann (d. 18 November 1483) a colonel in the imperial army, fell in the battle of Dendermonde
 Helen (d. 11 November 1514), married Johann II of Waldburg-Wolfegg (d. 19 October 1511)

Ancestry

References 
 E. G. Johler: Geschichte, Land- und Ortskunde der souverainen teutschen Fürstenthümer Hohenzollern Hechingen und Sigmaringen, Stettin'sche Buchhandlung, Ulm, 1824, Online
 Wolfgang Neugebauer: Die Hohenzollern. Anfänge, Landesstaat und monarchische Autokratie bis 1740, vol. 1, Stuttgart, Berlin, and Cologne, 1996
 Gustav Schilling: Geschichte des Hauses Hohenzollern in genealogisch fortlaufenden Biographien aller seiner Regenten von den ältesten bis auf die neuesten Zeiten, nach Urkunden und andern authentischen Quellen, Fleischer, Leipzig, 1843, Online

External links 
 Entry at Geneall.net
 Genealogy of Hohenzollern

Counts of Hohenzollern
People from Hechingen
House of Hohenzollern
1433 births
1488 deaths
15th-century German people